Heba Kadry is an Egyptian mastering engineer who currently resides in Brooklyn, New York. She is best known for her work with Bjork, Beach House, Slowdive, The Mars Volta, Neon Indian, Wooden Shjips, Lightning Bolt, White Hills, Alex G, Future Islands, Liturgy, !!!, White Lung, ...And You Will Know Us by the Trail of Dead, Nation of Language and The Hotelier. Kadry worked as a staff engineer at SugarHill Recording Studios from 2005 to 2006.

Selected discography

References

External links
Official Website
AllMusic Entry
Discogs Entry

Mastering engineers
Women audio engineers
Living people
Egyptian emigrants to the United States
The American University in Cairo alumni
Year of birth missing (living people)